Nyambi is a mythical deity of the Hambukushu tribe of Northwestern Botswana

The myth tells how people were created from molten rock. It says that Nyambi required people to pass through a fire for purification after creation. 

According to myth, dark skinned people passed through slowly while light skinned people passed through quickly. The Hambukushu also believe that Nyambi created animals from the same molten rock.

African mythology
Botswana culture